WIV or wiv may refer to:

 WIV, the National Rail station code for Wivenhoe railway station, Colchester, England
 Wuhan Institute of Virology
 Vitu language, Papua New Guinea